Pariveh, also known as Parivar, may refer to:
 Pariveh-ye Olya
 Pariveh-ye Sofla